Ludovico Micara (12 October 1775 – 24 May 1847) was an Italian Capuchin and Cardinal. He was born at Frascati, in the Papal States. Ordained in 1798, he became Dean of the College of Cardinals in 1824.

He was in hiding for the end of the Napoleonic Wars period. He became Apostolic Preacher in 1820. He was created cardinal in 1824. He became Bishop of Frascati in 1837 and Bishop of Ostia in 1844.

Notes

External links
Biography
Catholic Hierarchy page 

1775 births
1847 deaths
People from Frascati
20th-century Italian cardinals
Cardinal-bishops of Frascati
Cardinal-bishops of Ostia
Deans of the College of Cardinals
Capuchin bishops
Capuchin cardinals